Jeria is a surname. Notable people with the surname include:

Ángela Jeria (1926–2020), Chilean archaeologist, mother of Michele Bachelet
Carmela Jeria Gómez (1886–?), Chilean labor activist, typographer, and publisher
Patricio Jeria (born 1989), Chilean footballer

See also
Jeri